The Mongolian Arat squadron was a fighter squadron in the Soviet Air Force, funded by contributions from the Mongolian People's Republic, that was operational during World War II. The Mongolian word "ard" means "people", but was malapropriated in Russian and other languages as "Arat" to mean a nomadic pastoralist or herdsman.

In March 1943, following the presentation of the "Revolutionary Mongolia" tank brigade to the Red Army, the Little Khural (parliament) of Mongolia, under Gonchigiin Bumtsend, announced its intention to fund a fighter squadron within the Soviet Air Force. Despite its name, the pilots and personnel of the unit were Russian rather than Mongolian.

The Squadron's commander, was awarded the Hero of the Soviet Union medal.

Citations

Bibliography

External links
 Photos in 2 GIAP VVS

Fighter aircraft units and formations of the Soviet Union
Military history of Mongolia
1940s in Mongolia
Air units and formations of the Soviet Union in World War II
Military units and formations established in 1943
1943 establishments in the Soviet Union
Mongolia–Soviet Union relations